commonly known as Norbritz Hokkaido (ノルブリッツ北海道, Noruburittsu Hokkaidō) is a Japanese football club from Ebetsu, Hokkaido, within the Sapporo metropolitan area. They play in the Hokkaido League, the regionalized fifth level of the Japanese football league system.

History
It was founded on 1985 as Hokkaido Electric Power Company F.C., as a branch of the regional utility. In 2004 the club changed its name to Norbritz, and began as an independent entity. The club name of Norbritz is a portmanteau of the German words "nord" and "blitz" (albeit improperly romanised; the correct should be Norblitz), meaning Northern Lightning.

They have won the Hokkaido League a record 18 times. In 2012, after winning the Hokkaido League, Norbritz played the Regional League promotion series, ending in third place and therefore qualifying to play a play-off series against the 17th-placed team of the 2012 Japan Football League, Tochigi Uva F.C. They barely lost the series on penalties and therefore missed the chance to play in the JFL.

Current squad
Squad for 2022 season. Last update: 17 August 2022

League record

Key
Pos. = Position in league; GP = Games played; W = Games won; D = Games drawn; L = Games lost; Pts = Points gained
Data Source rsssf.org

Honours
Hokkaido Soccer League
Champions: (18) 1992, 1993, 1995, 1996, 1997, 1998, 1999, 2000, 2003, 2004, 2005, 2006, 2007, 2008, 2011, 2012, 2013, 2016

References

External links
 
 Official Facebook page

Football clubs in Japan
Sports teams in Hokkaido
Association football clubs established in 1985
1985 establishments in Japan